Sharun may refer to:
 Corbin Sharun (b. 1988), Canadian football player
 Sharun, Iran, a village in Zanjan Province, Iran